Honduras competed at the 2000 Summer Olympics in Sydney, Australia.

Athletics

Football

Men's tournament 
Team Roster

 ( 1.) Carlos Escobar
 ( 2.) Iván Guerrero
 ( 3.) Elmer Montoya
 ( 4.) Junior Izaguirre
 ( 5.) Walter López
 ( 6.) Carlos Paez
 ( 7.) Francisco Pavón
 ( 8.) Jaime Rosales
 ( 9.) David Suazo
 (10.) Julio César de León
 (11.) Jairo Martinez
 (12.) Maynor René Suazo
 (13.) Elvis Scott
 (14.) Luis Ramírez
 (15.) Julio César Suazo
 (16.) Danilo Turcios
 (17.) Mario Chirinos
 (18.) Noel Valladares
 (19.) Carlos Salinas
 (20.) Hector Gutierrez
 (21.) José Rivera

Group stage

Swimming

See also
Honduras at the 1998 Central American and Caribbean Games
Honduras at the 1999 Pan American Games
Honduras at the 2002 Central American and Caribbean Games

References
Official Olympic Reports
Olympedia.org

Nations at the 2000 Summer Olympics
Olympics
2000